Ponta do Sol is the northernmost point of both Cape Verde and the Island of Santo Antão. It is located 300 meters north of the city center of Ponta do Sol. The former Agostinho Neto Airport was located on the headland.

Ponta do Sol Lighthouse

The lighthouse at the far end of the headland (Portuguese: Farol de Ponta do Sol) is a metal post with a square gallery. It is painted with white and red horizontal bands.

See also
List of lighthouses in Cape Verde
Geography of Cape Verde

References

Headlands of Cape Verde
Geography of Santo Antão, Cape Verde
Ribeira Grande Municipality